Bergamini is an Italian surname. The meaning of the name comes from the 'occupational name from bergamino ‘cowherd dairy farmer’ a derivative of the placename Bergamo the cowherds of the Po valley having originally come from Bergamo and the Bergamese Alps.'

Notable people with the surname include:

Carlo Bergamini (disambiguation), multiple people
David Bergamini (1928–1983), American writer
Deborah Bergamini (born 1967), Italian politician
Giancarlo Bergamini (born 1926), Italian fencer
Joe Bergamini, American musician
John Van Wie Bergamini (1888–1975), American architect
Lamberto Bergamini (1885–1957), Italian opera singer
Marco Bergamini (born 1988), Italian footballer
Silvio Bergamini (1923–1994), Italian rower

See also 
Bergamin

References 

Italian-language surnames